Oakland Hills is an informal term used to indicate the city neighborhoods lying within the eastern portion of Oakland, California.  The northernmost neighborhoods were devastated by the Oakland firestorm of 1991.

Geography

The geologic feature
"Oakland Hills" is most commonly an informal name for that section of the Berkeley Hills range which extends along the eastern side of Oakland, California. In recent decades, it has become the more common popular term although it remains "officially" incorrect among geographers and gazetteers. Before the establishment of the University of California in Berkeley, the range was called the Contra Costa Hills.

The common usage often includes another officially unnamed ridge which runs in front (west) of the Berkeley/"Oakland" Hills, as well as the linear valley enclosed between the two ridges in the Montclair District along State Route 13. This other ridge, a shutter ridge created by the Hayward Fault, lends its informal name, "Rockridge", only to the district of Oakland at its northwest end, although it extends southeast to the junction of Highway 13 and I-580 in East Oakland and includes most of the small residential community of Piedmont, California. Plant communities are diverse, ranging from oak-grassland savanna and chaparral on sunny exposed slopes, to woods of oak, madrone, bay laurel, pine and redwoods in shady canyons.

Oakland Hills neighborhoods
The Oakland Hills neighborhoods comprise the highest elevations within the city's land area, following the alignment of the hills and the central section of the Hayward Fault Zone. The area includes all of Oakland lying east of State Route 13 and east of I-580 south of its junction with Route 13. The area includes Upper Rockridge, Oakmore, Montclair and Mountain View Cemetery. The Oakland Hills touch the eastern border of Piedmont, California and include a section of the Claremont neighborhood, the northern part of which lies within the city of Berkeley. The Oakland Hills also include the northern section of Lake Chabot Regional Park and borders Robert Sibley Volcanic Regional Preserve, Huckleberry Botanic Regional Preserve, Redwood Regional Park and Anthony Chabot Regional Park; all part of the East Bay Regional Park District.

Neighborhoods

Northeast Hills
 Claremont (southern portion)
 Forestland
 Glen Highlands
 Hiller Highlands
 Joaquin Miller Park
 Lake Temescal
 Merriwood
 Montclair
 Montclair Business District
 Mountain View Cemetery
 Oakmore
 Panoramic Hill
 Piedmont Pines
 Shepherd Canyon
 Upper Rockridge

Southeast Hills

 Chabot Park
 Crestmont
Grass Valley, Oakland, California
 Sequoyah Heights
 Sheffield Village
 Skyline-Hillcrest Estates
 Caballo Hills
 Leona Heights
 Laurel
 Redwood Heights
 Woodminster

Culture 

Several popular cultural sites and events are located in the Oakland hills:
 Chabot Space and Science Center
 Woodminster Summer Musicals
 Montclair Jazz & Wine Festival
 Joseph Knowland State Arboretum and Park
 Oakland Zoo

References

Neighborhoods in Oakland, California
Berkeley Hills